The nominees for the 28th TCA Awards were announced by the Television Critics Association on June 6, 2012. The winners were announced on July 28, 2012 at the Beverly Hilton Hotel in a ceremony hosted by Bryan Cranston.

Winners and nominees

Multiple wins 
The following shows received multiple wins:

Multiple nominations 
The following shows received multiple nominations:

References

External links
Official website
2012 TCA Awards at IMDb.com

2012 television awards
2012 in American television
TCA Awards ceremonies